The 2010 Kazakhstan Hockey Cup was the 8th edition of the Kazakhstan Hockey Cup, the national ice hockey cup competition in Kazakhstan. Eight teams participated and Gornyak Rudny won its 1st cup.

First round

Group A

Group B

Final round

Placing round

Final

References

2010–11 in Kazakhstani ice hockey
Kazakhstan Hockey Cup